Burwood Highway is a major transportation link with Melbourne's eastern suburbs. It begins in the suburb of Kooyong, Melbourne at the junction of the Monash Freeway as Toorak Road between Monash Freeway and Warrigal Road, and finishes in Belgrave, Victoria in the Dandenong Ranges. The highway is considered a major link for people who live in the Dandenong Ranges, as it is the only major feeder roadway in the general area other than Canterbury Road, Ferntree Gully Road, EastLink and Wellington Road.

Route

Burwood Highway is a primary route between Melbourne and the eastern suburbs, and the area around Belgrave. It begins at its junction with CityLink and Monash Freeway as Toorak Road, a four lane single carriageway, which is often clogged with heavy traffic, as well as trams travelling along the roadway for some of the route. Just east of the intersection with Warrigal Road, the highway widens to become a six-lane dual carriageway highway, with a dedicated central median for trams tracks, carrying the Route 75 service to Vermont South, as Burwood Highway. A few kilometres before Belgrave, the highway narrows again to a single carriageway.

Main destinations beyond Belgrave, along Belgrave-Gembrook Road:
 Emerald (Shire of Cardinia) (46 km from Melbourne) (11 km from Belgrave)
 Cockatoo (Shire of Cardinia) (52 km from Melbourne) (17 km from Belgrave)
 Gembrook (Shire of Cardina) (60 km from Melbourne) (25 km from Belgrave)

History
The passing of the Highways and Vehicles Act of 1924 through the Parliament of Victoria provided for the declaration of State Highways, roads two-thirds financed by the State government through the Country Roads Board (later VicRoads). The Burwood Highway was declared a State Highway in the 1959/60 financial year, from Warrigal Road in Burwood via Vermont South, to Upper Ferntree Gully (for a total of 12.5 miles); before this declaration, these roads were referred to as Burwood Road and (Main) Fern Tree Gully Road. The highway was eventually extended a further 4 km east along Monbulk Road to Belgrave in June 1990, and west along Toorak Road from Warrigal Road to the South Eastern Arterial at Kooyong in October 1993, however this last section was still known (and signposted) as Toorak Road. The tram line was extended 1.7 km along the central median through Burwood East from Middleborough Road to Blackburn Road in July 1993.

The Burwood Highway was signed as Metropolitan Route 26 between Burwood and Belgrave in 1965; with Victoria's conversion to the newer alphanumeric system in the late 1990s, the section between Upper Ferntree Gully and Belgrave was replaced by route C412.

The passing of the Road Management Act 2004 granted the responsibility of overall management and development of Victoria's major arterial roads to VicRoads: in 2004, VicRoads re-declared the Burwood Highway (Arterial #6750) from the Monash Freeway in Hawthorn to Belgrave-Gembrook Road in Belgrave.

Major intersections

See also

 Highways in Australia
 Highways in Victoria

References

Highways and freeways in Melbourne
Transport in the City of Stonnington
Transport in the City of Boroondara
Transport in the City of Whitehorse
Transport in the City of Knox
Transport in the Shire of Yarra Ranges